Selhurst Depot
is located in Selhurst, Croydon, England on the Brighton Main Line and is near Selhurst station. The depot code is SU.

The depot occupies a triangle of land which is bordered on one side by the Victoria Lines and on the other by the London Bridge Lines. It was built on the site of the former Croydon Common Athletic Ground, where Crystal Palace F.C. played Football League matches between 1920 and 1924.

Within the main office building is located Selhurst traincrew depot, where many drivers and conductors are based. The depot has extensive stabling sidings, the three main groups of which are known as: Chalk, AC (which were so named because that was where the trains of the former AC system were stabled) and North. There is a large maintenance shed, an AC test rig (for dual voltage units equipped with pantographs), a train wash plant, and a cleaning shed. At the north east corner of the site near to Norwood Junction station is the smaller Norwood drivers' depot, and beside it the diesel fuelling point. Selhurst is unusual in that the maximum speed within the depot is 15 mph rather than the usual 5 mph, and signalled train movements are permissive.

Allocation 
In 2016, the depot's allocation consisted of Southern Class 171 DMUs, Class 377 and Class 455 EMUs.

The depot is owned by Network Rail and operated by the Southern train operating company.

As of 2023, the depot's allocation consists of Class 171 DMUs and Class 377.

References 

Railway depots in London
Train driver depots in England
Transport in the London Borough of Croydon